Events in the year 2018 in Tonga.

Incumbents
 Monarch: Tupou VI
 Prime Minister: ʻAkilisi Pōhiva

Events

12 February – Tonga was hit by the Cyclone Gita, the strongest cyclone to strike Tonga in its recorded history, with winds of up to 195km/h.

Sports 
9 to 25 February – Tonga participated at the 2018 Winter Olympics in PyeongChang, South Korea, represented by a single athlete, cross-country skier Pita Taufatofua.

Deaths

References

 
2010s in Tonga
Years of the 21st century in Tonga
Tonga
Tonga